Epaminóndas "Nótis" Mariás (born 5 April 1957) is a Greek political scientist, politician, and Member of the European Parliament (MEP).  He is a former member of the Independent Greeks and sits in the European Conservatives and Reformists group in the European Parliament, of which he is one of the three Vice-Chairmen.

Marias was elected to the Hellenic Parliament at the May 2012 election, representing Heraklion in Crete.  He was re-elected a month later, again representing Heraklion.  Marias was elected to the European Parliament at the 2014 election, at which the Independent Greeks won 3.5% of the vote: entitling them to one MEP.

Before his election to Parliament, Marias was a Professor in the Department of Economics at the University of Crete.  He holds a BA in Law from the National and Kapodistrian University of Athens, an LL.M in Law from the London School of Economics, and a Ph.D in Political and Social Sciences from Panteion University.

External links
 Official Website of Notis Marias
 University of Crete faculty biography of Notis Marias

References

European Conservatives and Reformists MEPs
MEPs for Greece 2014–2019
Greek political scientists
National and Kapodistrian University of Athens alumni
Alumni of the London School of Economics
Panteion University alumni
1957 births
Living people
Politicians from Thessaloniki
Academic staff of the University of Crete
Greek MPs 2012 (May)
Greek MPs 2012–2014
Greek legal scholars